The Chicana/Latina Foundation (CLF) is a non-profit organization that promotes professional and leadership development of Latinas. The Foundation's mission is to empower Chicanas/Latinas through personal, educational, and professional advancement.

History
In 1977, three first generation Latinas (Yolanda Ronquillo, Olga Terrazas, and Margaret Santos) who attended the University of California, Berkeley decided to form the foundation to help future generations of Latina college students.

References

Hispanic and Latino American feminism